Chase Buchanan (born June 4, 1991) is an inactive American male tennis player. Buchanan grew up and attended grade school and high school in New Albany, Ohio and attended Ohio State University as a member of the tennis team.

Career
Buchanan reached no. 6 on the junior rankings on March 9, 2009. His first title came at age 15 on the junior tour. He emerged victorious at the Panama Bowl in both singles, emerging from the qualifying to do so; and doubles, alongside fellow 2009 U.S. Open wildcard Devin Britton. He won the 2008 Easter Bowl, beating Alex Llompart in the final. In 2008 and 2009, Buchanan was rated no. 1 in the United States by both TennisRecruiting and Tennis RPI.

In 2009, Buchanan won the USTA Boys 18s National Championship in Kalamazoo, Michigan. Buchanan competed in the 2009 US Open as a wildcard in the men's singles draw. He fell there to Jo-Wilfried Tsonga. He reached the junior singles final of the U.S. Open the same year, falling to Bernard Tomic in the final. His highest ATP ranking was no. 158 in singles.

Doubles performance timeline

''This table is current through 2012 US Open.

References

External links 
 
 

American male tennis players
Ohio State Buckeyes men's tennis players
Sportspeople from Columbus, Ohio
People from New Albany, Ohio
Tennis people from Ohio
1991 births
Living people
21st-century American people